Ergi Kırkın (born 27 January 1999) is a Turkish tennis player.

Kırkın has a career high ATP singles ranking of World No. 270 achieved on 25 July 2022. He has won 9 ITF singles titles. He also has a career high ATP doubles ranking of World No. 330 achieved on 3 October 2022.

Kırkın made his ATP main draw debut at the 2018 Antalya Open in the doubles draw partnering Koray Kırcı.

External links
 
 

1999 births
Living people
Turkish male tennis players
Sportspeople from Ankara
21st-century Turkish people